Timothy Sylvester Hogan (September 23, 1909 – January 30, 1989) was a United States district judge of the United States District Court for the Southern District of Ohio.

Education and career

Born in Wellston, Ohio, Hogan received an Artium Baccalaureus degree from Xavier University in 1930 and a Juris Doctor from the University of Cincinnati College of Law in 1931. He was in private practice in Cincinnati, Ohio from 1931 to 1941. He served as special counsel to the State Attorney General's Office of Ohio from 1937 to 1941. Hogan joined the United States Army Air Corps during World War II, serving from 1942 to 1946 and rising to the rank of lieutenant colonel. Upon discharge, he sought the office of Ohio Attorney General but lost. He returned to his private law practice and again served as special counsel to the State Attorney General from 1948 to 1950. He also began a long career as a lecturer at the University of Cincinnati Law School from 1950 to 1962.

Federal judicial service

Hogan was nominated by President Lyndon B. Johnson on September 30, 1966, to a seat on the United States District Court for the Southern District of Ohio vacated by Judge John Weld Peck II. He was confirmed by the United States Senate on October 20, 1966, and received his commission on November 3, 1966. He served as Chief Judge from 1975 to 1977. He assumed senior status on September 24, 1979. Hogan served in that capacity until his death on January 30, 1989.

Personal

Hogan was the son of Ohio Attorney General Timothy Sylvester Hogan.

References

Sources
 
 History of the sixth district
 

Xavier University alumni
University of Cincinnati College of Law alumni
1909 births
1989 deaths
People from Wellston, Ohio
Judges of the United States District Court for the Southern District of Ohio
United States district court judges appointed by Lyndon B. Johnson
20th-century American judges
University of Cincinnati College of Law faculty
United States Army personnel of World War II
United States Army officers
Ohio Democrats